Flanders (1992 – February 2010) was an American Thoroughbred racing filly. In 1994, she won all five of her races, although she was disqualified from the Matron Stakes and placed last due to testing positive for the prohibited therapeutic drug isoxuprine. She then went on to win the Frizette Stakes by 21 lengths. She is best known for winning the Breeders' Cup Juvenile Fillies. She came out of the race with a condylar fracture of the cannon bone and a fractured sesamoid. She underwent surgery and was retired in early 1995. She was euthanized in February 2010 because of complications following a paddock accident.

Pedigree

References

1994 Frizette Stakes
1994 Breeders' Cup Juvenile Fillies

1992 racehorse births
2010 racehorse deaths
Racehorses trained in the United States
Racehorses bred in Kentucky
Breeders' Cup Juvenile Fillies winners
Thoroughbred family 25